Dhivehi Academy (Dhivehi: ދިވެހި އެކެޑަމީ), officially known as The Academy of the Dhivehi Language, established on 8 August 2011, is the national academy for promoting the Dhivehi language in the Maldives. The main office of the organization is located at Sosunge, in Malé, the capital of the Maldives.

History
Dhivehi Academy was established after the abolition of Maldives National Centre for Linguistic and Historic Research, which was locally known as Dhivehi Bahaai Thaareekhah Khidhumaiy Kuraa Qaumee Marukaz.

External links
 Dhivehi Academy official website

Maldivian language
Language regulators
2011 establishments in the Maldives
Organizations established in 2011
Malé